Sulphur Creek is a  tributary of Aliso Creek in Orange County in the U.S. state of California.

The Sulphur Creek watershed was once part of the territory of the semi-nomadic Acjachemen Native Americans, who were conquered by Spanish conquistadors in the 17th and 18th centuries and called the Juaneño after nearby Mission San Juan Capistrano. During the 19th century, the watershed became part of a rancho and was mostly agricultural and range land until the 1960s, when suburban residential development began in the watershed. Sulphur Creek Dam was built in 1966, forming Laguna Niguel Lake.

Today, the Sulphur Creek drainage basin includes parts of Laguna Niguel, Laguna Hills, and San Juan Capistrano. The creek also flows through parts of Laguna Niguel Regional Park and Aliso and Wood Canyons Regional Park. Urban runoff has changed the once seasonal creek into a permanent stream. Most of the creek has been channelized to control flooding and prevent erosion, although some sections still include riparian habitat.

Course
The creek begins at the outlet of a storm channel near the intersection of Crown Valley Parkway and Greenfield Drive, and flows in a southwesterly direction parallel to Crown Valley Parkway. The upper section of the creek is a narrow corridor of restored wetland, with the exception of concrete culverts under Moulton Parkway, Nueva Vista Drive and La Paz Road.

The creek makes a sharp turn to the north at Crown Valley Park, where it receives two small tributaries from the left, the Niguel Storm Drain and a smaller unnamed stream. The creek then flows north through a narrow valley, past the South Orange County Wastewater Authority (SOCWA) water treatment plant in a large concrete channel which reverts to a natural channel in Laguna Niguel Regional Park.

The creek exits the dam from the concrete spillway on the east side and flows through the middle of Laguna Niguel Regional Park. About a half-mile (0.8 km) below Sulphur Creek Dam, it is joined by North Sulphur Creek (also known as Narco Channel). North Sulphur Creek, which has mostly been channeled underground, is a major source of pollution in Sulphur Creek and lower Aliso Creek.
Sulphur Creek then runs west, passing Kite Hill and flows in a culvert under Alicia Parkway. Below this point it flows through a small canyon and receives an unnamed tributary from the left, before joining Aliso Creek at the edge of Aliso and Wood Canyons Wilderness Park.

Geology
About ten million years ago, much of western and southern Orange County and most of coastal Southern California was part of a warm and shallow sea. This sea receded over time, leaving a large and flat coastal plain.
This uplift changed the course of Sulphur Creek to run north to Aliso Creek, instead of flowing south to Salt Creek (see Watershed).

River sediments helped to create the broad and flat terrain and river valleys between the San Joaquin Hills and the much higher Santa Ana Mountains to the east. Sulphur Creek's watershed is located in a southern area of the San Joaquin Hills where many smaller hills have formed in a wider area instead of a single, tall, narrow mountain chain. These lower hills are composed primarily of sedimentary rocks and date from the Miocene period.  The oldest rocks in this area are referred to as the Vaqueros Formation, while the younger are named the Monterey Formation. This hilly area is drained by Sulphur Creek to the northwest, Salt Creek to the south, small and unnamed coastal canyons to the southwest, and small tributaries of Trabuco and Oso Creeks to the east. This area is located northwest of the San Juan Creek valley, southeast of the Aliso Creek valley, and west of the Oso Creek drainage.

Watershed

Primarily residential, it is bordered on the north by the Aliso Hills Channel drainage area (tributary to Aliso Creek), on the south and southwest by the basin of Salt Creek, and to the west by the Oso Creek watershed, a tributary basin of the Trabuco Creek watershed. Most of the basin of Sulphur Creek is hilly, and the topography has been heavily changed by suburban development. Several canyons that originally drained into the creek have been filled in order to build residential communities. Storm channels and drains are often built along the original course of these canyons.

History

Located to the southwest of Aliso Creek, Sulphur Creek historically lay in the territory of the Acjachemen Indian group, whose main population center was actually farther south, at the confluence of San Juan and Trabuco creeks.
A nearby village, Niguili, was located near the mouth of Aliso Creek likely near the confluence of Aliso and Sulphur Creeks. Present-day Laguna Niguel takes its name from this settlement. The Acjachemen were renamed the Juaneño by Spanish priests in the 18th century, who established a mission at the present-day location of San Juan Capistrano. Following the Spanish arrival, most Juaneño clustered around the mission in the south. Like many other once widespread Juaneño villages, Niguili was likely abandoned soon after, and there is no trace of it remaining.

From 1842 to the 1960s, the entire land area was known as Rancho Niguel, a Mexican land grant originally belonging to Juan Avila. By the 1960s, the City of Laguna Niguel bought a large portion of the ranch from the Moulton family; it was later donated to the county for recreational use. Resultantly, the upper and lower sections of the creek are now under county ownership, and Laguna Niguel Lake is managed by the Orange County Flood Control District.

This lake was annually stocked with fish, and by the 1960s, residential communities began to rise on the hills west of the main (southward-flowing) segment of the creek, while increasingly contaminated urban runoff began to contribute to the creek's flow. These hills originally consisted of high, narrow ridges dissected by steep but shallow and short canyons but were leveled to make way for buildings. In 1973 the  Laguna Niguel Regional Park was established in the lower third of the creek course, covering the extent of the creek from the head of Laguna Niguel Lake to where the creek crosses Alicia Parkway through a large culvert. In 1990 the final reach of the creek became part of Aliso and Wood Canyons Regional Park.

Environmental features and issues
Historically, the Sulphur Creek watershed was mostly hilly terrain consisting of chaparral and coastal sage scrub. Riparian forest likely consisting of live oak, sycamore, alder and other small trees lined the banks of the stream. Most of this native habitat was cleared for housing beginning in the 1960s, although a few undeveloped areas remain along hillsides, especially around Laguna Niguel Regional Park.

A number of exotic plant species have been introduced to the Sulphur Creek watershed including Arundo donax (giant reed), castor bean and tobacco tree. Arundo is especially problematic as it tends to crowd out other plant species, reducing habitat for native animals as well. It can grow extremely fast with a high rate of water consumption, and during flood events, arundo segments can be washed downstream, establishing new colonies.

While no raw sewage flows into the creek, the creek is contaminated by large quantities of urban runoff from impervious paved surfaces that collects toxins before pouring untreated into the creek. Such untreated runoff has caused contamination by E. coli and Enterovirus, making the water unsafe for human contact. The County of Orange estimates that 87 percent of the Sulphur Creek course is "severely degraded." Increasing concentrations of nutrients from fertilizer and other pollutants in urban runoff have caused algae blooms and eutrophication in the creek above Laguna Niguel Lake.

Several projects are under way in the Sulphur Creek watershed to remove non-native species and restore native riparian vegetation.

Aliso and Wood Canyons Regional Park, which is located at the lower extreme of Sulphur Creek, supports far more native species than the Sulphur Creek watershed.

Recreation

Laguna Niguel Lake is the primary recreational facility in the watershed and is said to be one of the largest fisheries of Southern Orange County. The lake is annually stocked with bluegill, catfish, and bass. Aside from the reservoir, there is no body of water in the watershed that is navigable. There are several other parks in the watershed; these are Crown Valley Park, Sulphur Creek Park, and others. A paved trail follows Sulphur Creek from near the terminus of Crown Valley Park to near its mouth at Alicia Parkway.

Etymology

The Geographic Names Information System lists "Arroyo Salada" (Spanish: Salt Canyon) as a variant name. Cañada Salada, translated to "Valley of Salt" or "Salt Canyon" (Durham's Place Names of the Greater Los Angeles Area, 2001) is another name for the lower section of the creek. These names, dating to Spanish times, imply that the creek was naturally salty or briny. As Salt Creek to the south bears a name of similar meaning, and that the "Arroyo Salada" Storm Channel occupies the lower section of the prehistoric Sulphur Creek watershed, there is further proof by salt concentrations that the two watersheds were once linked (see Watershed).

See also

Tributaries of Aliso Creek
Wood Canyon Creek
List of rivers of Orange County, California
List of rivers of California

References

Notes

Works cited

Armor, Samuel (1921). History of Orange County, California. Historic Record Co.
Carle, David (2005). Introduction to Water in California. University of California Press. .
Corby, Grant White (1922). The geology and paleontology of the San Joaquin and Niguel Hills, Orange County, California. Stanford University.
Durham, David L. (2001). Durham's Place Names of Greater Los Angeles. Quill Driver Books. .
Fritsche, A. Eugene; Behl, Richard J (2008). Geology of Orange County, California and the Irvine Ranch National Natural Landmark. Pacific Section, SEPM - The Society for Sedimentary Geology. .

External links
OC Watersheds

Rivers of Orange County, California
Laguna Hills, California
Laguna Niguel, California
Santa Ana Mountains
Subterranean rivers of the United States
Rivers of Southern California